Rebuck may refer to:

Gail Rebuck (born 1952), British publisher
Rebuck, Pennsylvania, an unincorporated community in Northumberland County, Pennsylvania, United States